Hugo Henrique Rocha Soares (born 16 October 1982 in Miragaia (Porto)) is a Portuguese footballer who plays for Sporting Clube Paivense as a defensive midfielder.

External links

1982 births
Living people
Portuguese footballers
Association football midfielders
Liga Portugal 2 players
Segunda Divisão players
FC Porto B players
A.D. Sanjoanense players
CD Ribeira Brava players
S.C. Espinho players
Gondomar S.C. players
Moreirense F.C. players
F.C. Penafiel players
Cypriot First Division players
Anagennisi Deryneia FC players
Ayia Napa FC players
Ethnikos Achna FC players
C.D. Cinfães players
Portuguese expatriate footballers
Expatriate footballers in Cyprus
Portuguese expatriate sportspeople in Cyprus
Footballers from Porto